National Institute of Industrial Engineering (NITIE) formerly National Institute for Training in Industrial Engineering, is a graduate business school under Ministry of HRD, Government of India located in Powai near Vihar Lake in Mumbai, and is ranked 9th among B-Schools of India as per NIRF 2022 rankings.

History
National Institute of Industrial Engineering (NITIE) was established by the Government of India in 1963 with the assistance of United Nations Development Programme (UNDP) through the International Labour Organization (ILO) to create skilled professionals. It was funded by the Government of India and registered as a society under the Societies Registration Act, 1860.

Noted industrialist Anand Mahindra and HDFC chairman Deepak Parekh had suggested, in 2007, the change in name of NITIE to an IIM, Mumbai. The then Prime Minister Dr Manmohan Singh had promised to look into the issue. For several years no step was taken in this direction, but recently, on January 31, 2022, the Ministry of Education (India) has constituted a committee of experts to deliberate on the feasibility of bringing the National Institute of Industrial Engineering (NITIE) Mumbai under IIM Act, 2017.  The list of experts includes Shri Ashish Kumar Chauhan, MD & CEO, Bombay Stock Exchange & Chancellor University of Allahabad, Prof. Pawan Kumar Singh, Director, IIM Tiruchirappalli, Prof. Pramod Kumar Jain, Director, IIT BHU, Prof. Subhasis Choudhuri, Director, IIT Bombay, Shri Pradeep Goyal, CMD, M/s Pradeep Metals.

Academics
National Institute of Industrial Engineering offers post graduate diplomas in various fields of management and industrial engineering. It also offers doctoral level fellowship programs. Annually, NITIE trains over 2000 professionals through its various week long Management Development Programs (MDPs) and the unit based programs (UBPs) in different areas of Industrial Engineering & Management.

Rankings

NITIE is ranked ninth among management schools in India by the National Institutional Ranking Framework (NIRF) in 2022.

Placements
Despite the Covid-19 pandemic and the resulting economic downturn, NITIE recorded excellent placements for the batch of 2021. A total of 130 companies participated in the final placement season at NITIE this year. The highest package stood at INR 44 Lakhs, with the average of top 10% of the batch at INR 35.84 Lakhs, top 20% of the batch at INR 31.27 Lakhs, top 30% of the batch at INR 24.47 Lakhs and an overall batch average at INR 19.47 Lakhs per year. 28% of the batch received Pre-Placement offers (PPO) through their Summer Internships at top firms.

Student life
NITIE is a student-run institute that has around 30 Committees and Forums that the students can be a part of. Around a year, these committees organize various events and programs like Sansmaran – Alumni Meet, Avartan – Flagship Business fest of NITIE, Mahamandi, Arohan, Panel discussions, Leadership talks, Social Volunteering works, etc.

References

External links
 

Business schools in Mumbai
Educational institutions established in 1963
1963 establishments in Maharashtra